Crocus aerius  is a species of flowering plant in the genus Crocus of the family Iridaceae. It is a cormous perennial native to Turkey.

Commonly found in the Pontus Mountains growing in grassy areas and those with a lot of stones at an elevation of 2000 meters, flowering occurs in May.

The glaucous leaves are curved and more firm than typical Crocus foliage.

References

aerius
Flora of Turkey
Plants described in 1847